Bathynectes is a genus of crabs in the family Polybiidae.

Species

 Bathynectes brevispina Stimpson, 1871
 Bathynectes longipes (Risso, 1816)
 Bathynectes longispina Stimpson, 1871
 Bathynectes maravigna (Prestandrea, 1839)
 Bathynectes piperitus Manning & Holthuis, 1981
 Bathynectes muelleri † Ossó & Stalennuy, 2011

References

Portunoidea
Crustaceans of the Atlantic Ocean